The Club is a third-person shooter video game developed by Bizarre Creations and published by Sega. The story of the game centers on The Club, an underground blood sport controlled by a wealthy elite who place their bets on who will survive the gladiatorial-style combat.

Plot
The player chooses from a roster of characters who are forced to compete in The Club, a modern form of gladiatorial combat. They are under the watchful eye of a middle-aged man known as The Secretary. There are 8 characters to choose from; each with its own attributes and ending: 

 Dragov: A Russian convict who is rescued by The Club after attempting an escape across the Siberian tundra. He is the strongest of the competitors, but also the slowest. The game ends with Dragov escaping The Club compound through a helicopter, killing the guards in the process.

 Renwick: A former New York detective, who lost his job after repeated attempts to locate The Club, and continued the search on his own. He is fairly well balanced, with particular attention to speed. The ending shows Renwick waking up in a derelict building - dazed and confused. He then receives a phone call from The Secretary saying he is released from The Club unharmed but is now a fugitive to law enforcement, a small price to pay for meddling with The Club's affairs.

 Finn: A gambler whose debts landed him in trouble with the mob, and resulted in his Club membership. He is also well balanced, but with a little extra emphasis on stamina. After completing The Club, he sends the money he owes to the mob with a bomb inside the briefcase, killing them in the process.

 Seager: A Canadian extreme sports junkie, who joins The Club in search of that next high. He sacrifices strength for above average speed and stamina. The Secretary thanks him for his participation and gives him his cash reward, to which he declines and simply says, "I want to play."

 Kuro: A Japanese double agent posing as a Triad Society assassin. Kuro is among the fastest competitors in The Club. He is last seen being interrogated by law enforcement, who are actually The Club members in disguise, suggesting that they intend to recruit Kuro again.

 Killen: An Australian man who survived through The Club once, only to be forced back when his daughter's life is threatened. Killen is well balanced, with an extra bump to strength. As promised, his daughter is released from custody and Killen is seen exiting the Club compound on a motorcycle.

 Adjo: An African giant who seeks to redeem his violent past, but is ultimately forced to participate in the tournament. Adjo is also one of the strongest competitors in The Club. He rudely refuses his reward money in the end, saying he wants his village to be left in peace and marches out of The Club.

 Nemo: A psychopathic Englishman who only lives to kill. Nemo is extremely fast and quite strong, but has very low stamina. It is revealed that Nemo is The Secretary's son, but when asked by the guard his true identity, The Secretary replies he is "no one."

Gameplay
The Club is played from a third-person perspective. The player must make their way through a level as quickly as possible, or defend one location and survive attacks from respawning enemies for a set amount of time. Gameplay is centered on a score mechanic where each kill acts as a bonus multiplier. Various kill methods, such as ricochets, head shots, and long range shots earn extra points. After each kill, the player has several seconds to get another kill before the bonus multiplier starts to reduce. This interval also reduces the higher the multiplier gets. Icons are scattered throughout each level, offering bonuses. Weapons, ammunition and health are present but the player is not rewarded for picking them up. The Club incorporates elements from racing video games, including time attack events.

Multiplayer
The game includes eight multiplayer modes, with online leaderboards to compare scores. Online games can feature up to seven opponents on-line, or four-player local split screen.

Development
The lead designer of the game was Matt Cavanagh who described the title as "a racing game with guns". At first the game was literally a shooting gallery with limited AI. After 6 months of development a new prototype was created with an emphasis on scoring rather than narrative. The gameplay was designed before any setting and back story was created. Many publishers declined to take on the title before Sega chose to back it.

The title was released globally on February 8, 2008. Composer Richard Jacques wrote the score for the single player levels, Chris Chudley from Audioantics wrote the score for the multiplayer levels, while Jesper Kyd scored the main theme.

Reception

The Club received positive reviews. Eurogamer's Tom Bramwell complimented it as "a shooter that turns tired genre conventions around with a bullet to the shoulder", but stated that it would be "divisive" due to the game's run and gun mentality, which went against the contemporary trend towards tactical shooters. Bramwell pointed out that The Club "does for the third-person shooter what no one else has even bothered trying to do: moving it closer to the 2D shoot-'em-ups of old in a manner that appeals anew".

Andrew Reiner, writing for Game Informer, mentioned Bizarre Creations' background and its influence on The Club: "The speed-first mentality of the racing genre is cleverly infused into the framework of a run-and-gun shooter...And to truly capture the racing atmosphere, some of the levels have players running laps in specific environments...It may sound odd, but the racing shooter formula works amazingly well". Reiner called The Club "a nice change of pace, and hopefully the beginning of a new genre".

GamePro reviewer Cameron Lewis wrote: "What might be most impressive about The Club is that despite the many disparate elements that it cherry-picks from genres as diverse as racing, skateboarding, and first-person shooters, the whole never bears the disjointed feel of a Frankenstein creation".

IGN reviewer Alec Meer stated that the scoring system "will prove an immediate turn-off for some" and went on to blame the "fairly dismal" graphics for putting potential players off, saying that "it's about how it plays, not how it looks. But if it looked better, more people would want to play it". He praised the gameplay as "it does the job it sets out to do very well", but said the game only had "specialist appeal".

VideoGamer.com's Tom Orry praised The Club as "a game packed full of style, brimming with replay value and demanding of the most skilful players around. This is an arcade shooter like you've never seen before...The Club is one of the finest examples of bringing the essence of arcade gaming to modern consoles".

Edge called The Club "a heavily structured and well-considered score-attack game", granting it 7/10.

References

2008 video games
Bizarre Creations games
Games for Windows certified games
Multiplayer and single-player video games
PlayStation 3 games
Sega video games
Split-screen multiplayer games
Third-person shooters
Video games about death games
Video games developed in the United Kingdom
Video games scored by Jesper Kyd
Video games scored by Richard Jacques
Windows games
Xbox 360 games